Ruislip Manor is an area of Ruislip in the London Borough of Hillingdon in West London.

The construction of a halt on the Metropolitan Railway in the area in 1912 led to the development of Ruislip Manor, on what was rural land.

History
Ruislip Manor was originally owned by King's College, Cambridge, as a part of the Manor of Ruislip. At the turn of the 20th century, Ruislip Manor was undeveloped rural land until a halt was constructed in 1912 as part of the Metropolitan Railway running between Harrow and Uxbridge. George Ball later purchased 186 acres to the south of the railway line from King's College with construction of the new estate taking place between 1933 and 1939.  Ball hoped the new housing would be available to the working man who wished to purchase his own home. The original plan under the "Manor Homes" name had been for 2,322 homes which Ball agreed would not number more than 14 per acre. The total number of houses was gradually reduced by 50 in 1934, then a further 35 in 1935, to allow the inclusion of Lady Bankes Primary School, St. Paul's Church and the Black Bull public house.

The school was designed by the Middlesex County architect W.T. Curtis and the assistant architect for educational buildings, H. W. Burchett. A temporary school was opened by the Ruislip-Northwood Urban District Council on 17 October 1934 in the Victoria Hall. Lady Bankes school opened on 7 January 1936, named after Mary, Lady Bankes who had defended Corfe Castle from the Roundheads in the English Civil War.

The railway halt was later rebuilt as a station in 1938 and became Ruislip Manor tube station.

Along with surrounding areas, Ruislip Manor suffered from heavy aerial bombardment from the Luftwaffe during the Second World War because of its proximity to the fighter airfield RAF Northolt. Children from Bourne Junior School in South Ruislip were sent to Lady Bankes School after their school was requisitioned by the Royal Air Force. Some of the children from Lady Bankes were then accommodated at Sacred Heart School nearby.

Ruislip Manor library was sold for redevelopment by the London Borough of Hillingdon in 2007 and rebuilt on the site of the Victoria Hall, as part of an investment programme for the borough's libraries. The new library opened in October 2007.

References

Citations

Bibliography
 Bowlt, Eileen. M. (2007) Around Ruislip, Eastcote, Northwood, Ickenham & Harefield. Stroud: Sutton Publishing

External links
 Ruislip Manor at Ruislip Online

Areas of London
Districts of the London Borough of Hillingdon